London Regiment may refer to two infantry regiments in the British Army:
 London Regiment (1908–1938)
 London Regiment (1993–2022)